Herbal viagra is a name that can be given to any herbal product advertised as treating erectile dysfunction.   There are many different products advertised as herbal viagra, but with varying ingredients. There are no clinical trials or scientific studies that support the effectiveness of any of these ingredients for the treatment of erectile dysfunction and some products have been found to contain drugs and other adulterants, and have been the subject of FDA and FTC warnings and actions to remove them from the market.

The name "herbal viagra" is taken from the brand name Viagra, under which drug company Pfizer sells sildenafil citrate, a drug that is used to treat erectile dysfunction.  Viagra has become a generic term for many people discussing drugs designed to treat erectile dysfunction, even those which do not contain sildenafil.

Herbal viagras, contrary to what the name suggests, do not normally contain sildenafil citrate. However, sildenafil and chemicals similar to sildenafil have been found as adulterants in many supplements which are sold as herbal viagra or "natural" sexual enhancement products.  The United States Food and Drug Administration has warned consumers that any sexual enhancement product that claims to work as well as prescription products is likely to contain such a contaminant. Scientists estimated that >60% of the consumed sildenafil in the Netherlands is from illegal sources such as adulterated dietary supplements.

Herbal viagras often carry a number of dangerous side effects. Primarily, they cause abnormally low blood pressure and can restrict blood flow to vital organs. There is also evidence to suggest some preparations may be toxic if taken in larger doses.  Additional side effects and dangers of common herbal viagra adulterants, such as sulfoaildenafil, acetildenafil and other analogs, are unknown because these ingredients have not had thorough review in human clinical trials.

Herbal viagra is predominantly sold through the internet, and in 2003 approximately 4% or 1 in 25 of all email spam offered herbal viagra, genuine pharmaceuticals, and other herbal remedies.

References

Dietary supplements
Herbalism
Consumer fraud